Ponta do Seixas, also known as Cape Branco, is a cape on the Atlantic coast of Paraíba state, eastern Brazil, that forms the easternmost point of the American continents, roughly 8 km (5 mi) southeast of João Pessoa, the state capital.

It is surrounded by white sand beaches bordered by flat-topped forms of sedimentary strata called "tabuleiros", which rise sharply above the beaches to heights between 150 and 500 ft, and enjoys abundant rainfall. It lies on the coastal highway connecting João Pessoa and the port of Cabedelo farther north.

References

Landforms of Paraíba
Extreme points of Earth
Seixas
João Pessoa, Paraíba